Color blindness, also known as color vision deficiency, is a symptom that concerns diminished color vision and the decreased ability to see or distinguish colors.

The term may also refer to:

Vision
 Congenital red-green color blindness, the genetic condition that causes the most cases of color blindness.
 Dichromacy, a type of color vision possessed by most mammals; partial color blindness when in humans.
 Monochromacy, a lack of color vision; total color blindness when in humans.
 Achromatopsia, a syndrome that includes total color blindness.
 Blue cone monochromacy, a genetic condition that causes total color blindness.

Law and sociology 
 Racial color blindness, discussing the connotations surrounding the term in law and society

Arts and entertainment
 Colour Blind (play), by Kaul and Kalki Koechlin

Books
 Colorblind (book), a 2010 book on racism by Nicholas Morris
 Colour Blind, a 1953 novel by Catherine Cookson 
 Color Blind, a 1946 study of racism in Georgia by Margaret Halsey

Film and television
 Colour blind, 1988 TV series with Niamh Cusack

 "Color Blind", an episode from season 1 of Alias

Music

Albums
 Colorblind (Candice Alley album), 2003
 Colorblind (Robert Randolph album), 2006
 Colour Blind (Seaway album), 2015
 Colorblind, a 2010 album by Dutch singer Alain Clark
 Color Blind, a 1969 album by Dave "The Man" Allen

Songs
 "Colorblind", a song by Amber Riley
 "Colorblind" (Chroma Key song)
 "Colorblind" (Counting Crows song)
 "Colourblind" (Darius Campbell song)
 "Color Blind", by Diplo featuring Lil Xan; See Diplo discography
 "Color Blind", by Ice Cube from the album Death Certificate
 "Colour Blind", by Small Town Pistols
 "Colour Blind", by The Future Sound of London from Environments II